CRPF Valley Quick Action Team, also known as Valley QAT, is the elite anti-terrorist division of the CRPF active in Jammu and Kashmir. This team of expert commandos operates with the Indian Army, Jammu Police, and Kashmir Police.

History 
Valley QAT was formed initially to escort and provide security to convoy and VIPs . But after an attack on BSF camp near Srinagar airport this team lead from front to neutralise the terrorists and from then this team was fully converted as a special Operational team . after launching an attack on a CRPF convoy at Sampora Pampore

Selection 
All commandos of Valley QAT are volunteers. Soldiers of regular CRPF units go through selection process and training after volunteering for service to Valley QAT.

Phases 
There are four phases to become a commando in Valley QAT.

 Basic military training - To start the process, a candidate first must join the CRPF in and complete the basic training requirements, which vary according to the mode of entry and training center.
 Pre-Selection - This stage encompasses administrative procedures, a volunteer first requites to be posted in a CRPF unit operating in Jammu and Kashmir.
 Selection - The volunteer has to fulfill the laid down physical and medical standards.
 Advanced Training - After selection the volunteer has to qualify the specialized training which includes advanced weapon handling, navigation, close quarter battle (CQB), urban warfare, counter terrorism, unarmed combat and other courses across various training institutions.

Equipment 
The following equipment are used by the Valley QAT.

Small Arms

Pistol 

 Beretta semi-automatic pistol.
 Glock semi automatic pistol.

Assault Rifle 

 AK-47

Transport 

 Renault Sherpa

Gallantry Awards

Kirti Chakra 
Deputy Commandant Rahul Mathur

Shaurya Chakra 
Assistant Commandant Anirudh Pratap Singh

References 

Federal law enforcement agencies of India
Units of the Indian Peace Keeping Force
Central Armed Police Forces of India
Specialist law enforcement agencies of India